Everett Lamar "Rocky" Bridges (August 7, 1927 – January 27, 2015) was a middle infielder and third baseman with an 11-year career in Major League Baseball from 1951 to 1961. Bridges played for the Brooklyn Dodgers, Cincinnati Redlegs and St. Louis Cardinals of the National League, and the Washington Senators, Detroit Tigers, Cleveland Indians and Los Angeles Angels of the American League.

Playing career
Bridges was a native Texan who attended Long Beach Polytechnic High School in California. He became a journeyman ball player who made his big-league debut in 1951 with the Brooklyn Dodgers. As a utility infielder, he backed up two future Hall of Famers, Pee Wee Reese and Jackie Robinson and as a result, saw little playing time.

Subsequently, he was traded to Cincinnati Redlegs (as the Reds were known in the mid-1950s) and then eventually to the last place Washington Senators, where he obtained a starting position as a shortstop. In 1958, his first full season with the Senators, he was selected by New York Yankees manager Casey Stengel to the 1958 Major League Baseball All-Star Game, one of the few highlights of his career. Bridges career continued until 1961, playing for several American League teams.  His final career batting average was .247 with 16 home runs.
Despite his unimpressive career statistics, Bridges became a well known and respected ball player because of his hard work, hustle, spirit, and sense of humor.  In 1964, Sports Illustrated described him as "...one of the best stand up comics in the history of baseball."
Among his most famous quotes:
"It took me that long to learn how to spell it." -- after being traded from Cincinnati, where he played for four years. 

"That surprised everybody. They were close to launching an investigation." -- after being selected to the 1958 All-Star Team. 

"I'm in the twilight of a mediocre career ....I've had more numbers on my back than a bingo board." --- after being traded to the Detroit Tigers.

Coaching career
Following his active playing career, he served two terms (1962–63; 1968–71) as the third base coach of the Angels and one year (1985) in that role with the San Francisco Giants. Bridges also had a long career as a minor league manager in the Angels, Giants, San Diego Padres and Pittsburgh Pirates organizations. Over 21 seasons stretched between 1964 and 1989, Bridges' teams won 1,300 games and lost 1,358 (.489). His minor league managerial career is profiled in Jim Bouton's collection of baseball articles and essays entitled I Managed Good, But Boy Did They Play Bad. Bridges also managed the Leones de Ponce to the  pennant title of the Puerto Rico Baseball League in the 1968–69 season.

Legacy
The title of Bouton's book was reportedly based on a quote from Bridges. The Great American Baseball Card Flipping, Trading and Bubble Gum Book", said  "Rocky Bridges looked like a ballplayer. In fact, he may have looked more like a ballplayer than any other ballplayer who ever lived."

"Rocky Bridges undoubtedly has been one of the most popular men ever to wear the Washington uniform. He's an example of what 'hustle', 'desire', and 'spirit' will do." -- Washington Post sports columnist Bob Addie, 1958 

Bridges died of natural causes January 27, 2015, aged 87, in Coeur d'Alene, Idaho.

References

External links

 Rocky Bridges at SABR (Baseball BioProject)

1927 births
2015 deaths
American League All-Stars
Baseball coaches from California
Baseball players from California
Brooklyn Dodgers players
Buffalo Bisons (minor league) managers
California Angels coaches
Cincinnati Redlegs players
Cincinnati Reds players
Cleveland Indians players
Detroit Tigers players
Greenville Spinners players
Hawaii Islanders managers
Los Angeles Angels coaches
Los Angeles Angels players
Major League Baseball second basemen
Major League Baseball shortstops
Major League Baseball third base coaches
Major League Baseball third basemen
Minor league baseball managers
Montreal Royals players
People from Coeur d'Alene, Idaho
People from Refugio, Texas
Santa Barbara Dodgers players
San Francisco Giants coaches
St. Louis Cardinals players
Washington Senators (1901–1960) players
Long Beach Polytechnic High School alumni